T-POP Stage Show, formerly known as T-POP Stage, is a Thai music program broadcast by Workpoint. It airs live every Saturday at 21:30 ICT. The show features some of the latest and most popular artists who perform on stage. It is broadcast from Workpoint Studio in Bang Phun, Mueang Pathum Thani, Pathum Thani.

Hosts

T-pop Weekly Chart 
Music chart ranking "T-Pop Weekly Chart" formerly known as  "T-Pop Top Chart" has the following conditions:
 Music on the chart must not be soundtracks for movies, dramas, series, commercials, and sitcoms.
 A song stays on the chart for 4 weeks and is adjusted weekly.
 Scoring to rank songs calculate the total score for each week. By dividing the weight of the score into 100% according to the proportions.

Awards 
 Music of the week for the highest score song each week.
 Rookie of the week for the highest score debut song each week.
 OST of the week for the highest score OST song each week.

Winners

2021

2022

Achievements by artists

Quadruple Winners

Notes

References

General references

External links 
 

Thai music television series
Workpoint TV original programming
2021 Thai television series debuts
Music chart television shows
Thai-language television shows